Male Poljane is a small settlement just west of Velike Poljane in the Municipality of Škocjan in southeastern Slovenia (the traditional region of Lower Carniola). Within the municipality, it belongs to the Village Community of Zagrad. The municipality is now included in the Southeast Slovenia Statistical Region.

References

External links
Male Poljane at Geopedia

Populated places in the Municipality of Škocjan